Damian Kądzior (born 16 June 1992) is a Polish professional footballer who plays as a winger for Polish club Piast Gliwice.

Club career
Kądzior was born in Białystok, Poland, where he joined the Jagiellonia Białystok youth academy.

Jagiellonia Białystok 
Kądzior started playing for the Jagiellonia senior team in 2012, and made 3 appearances before being loaned out.

Loan to Motor Lublin 
Kądzior joined Motor Lublin on loan on a two-year loan. During his time at Lublin, he scored 8 goals in total for the club.

Loan to Dolcan Ząbki 
In January 2015, Kądzior joined Dolcan Ząbki, where he made a total of 33 appearances, scoring 8 goals.

Loan Wigry Suwałki 
On 29 February 2016, Kądzior joined Wigry Suwałki on loan until the end of the season. He scored 4 goals in 14 appearances for the club.

Wigry Suwałki 
On 1 July, he joined the club on a free transfer. During his time at the club, he scored a total of 20 goals in 53 appearances.

Górnik Zabrze 
On 4 July 2017, he joined Górnik Zabrze. He made his debut on 15 July, in a 3–1 win over Legia, playing a total of 62 minutes. He scored his first goal on 10 September, in a 2–1 in over Termalica. On 20 October, he scored twice during a 3–3 draw with Korona Kielce. His last appearance for the club was in a 2–0 win over Wisła Kraków.

Dinamo Zagreb 
In the early days of June, several Croatian newspaper websites, such as 24sata, had reported that Kądzior was close to a move to champions Dinamo Zagreb. On 18 June, the club officially announced that Kądzior, along with several others players, had joined the club, for a reported fee of around €500,000 and the club announced that he would wear the jersey number 92.

Eibar
On 29 August 2020, Kądzior agreed to a three-year deal with La Liga side SD Eibar.

Loan to Alanyaspor 
On 19 January 2021, Kądzior moved to Alanyaspor, on a loan until the end of the season.

International career 
In May 2018, Kądzior was named in the Poland national team's preliminary 35-man squad for the 2018 FIFA World Cup, hosted in Russia. However, he did not make the final 23-man squad. He made his debut for his country on 11 September 2018 in a friendly against Ireland. His first goal for Poland came on 10 June, against Israel during the UEFA 2020 Qualifiers.

Career statistics

Club

1 Three appearances in UEFA Champions League and five appearances in UEFA Europa League.2 All appearances in UEFA Europa League.3 One appearance in 2019 Croatian Football Super Cup.

International

International goal
Scores and results list Poland's goal tally first, score column indicates score after each Kądzior goal.

Honours

Club
Dinamo Zagreb
Croatian First League :  2018–19, 2019–20
Croatian Super Cup : 2019

Individual
Dinamo Zagreb
Player of the Year 2020

References

External links
 
 
 

1992 births
Living people
Sportspeople from Białystok
Association football midfielders
Polish footballers
Poland international footballers
Ekstraklasa players
I liga players
Croatian Football League players
La Liga players
Jagiellonia Białystok players
Motor Lublin players
Ząbkovia Ząbki players
Wigry Suwałki players
Górnik Zabrze players
GNK Dinamo Zagreb players
SD Eibar footballers
Piast Gliwice players
Polish expatriate footballers
Expatriate footballers in Croatia
Expatriate footballers in Spain
Polish expatriate sportspeople in Croatia
Polish expatriate sportspeople in Spain
Polish expatriate sportspeople in Turkey
Expatriate footballers in Turkey
Alanyaspor footballers